Al-Kashshaaf 'an Haqa'iq at-Tanzil, popularly known as Al-Kashshaaf  is a seminal tafsir (commentary on the Qur'an) by Al-Zamakhshari written in the 12th century. Considered a primary source by major scholars, it is famous for its deep linguistic analysis, demonstrations of the supremacy of declamation of the Qur'an, and the representation of the method the Qur'an uses to convey meaning using literary elements and figurative speech. However, it is criticized for the inclusion of Muʿtazilah philosophical views.

Background 

Al-Zamakhshari strongly insisted that scholars of the Muʿtazilah sect should have a basis tafsir of their own. Therefore, he started writing his commentary in 1132, after he was convinced by Emîr Ebü'l-Hasan İbn Vehhâs while he was residing in Mecca, and finished it in two years. He himself states that writing such a book in a short time is a blessing of God. During his research, he referred to many older works and commentaries, especially Zeccac’s Mean’il-Kuran, which constitutes the basis of his work.

Content 

In the preface, it is pointed out that commenting on the Quran is a challenging and difficult effort; and any mufassir willing to do so must have deep knowledge of Arabic language, literature, eloquence and culture, alongside critical thinking skills, a highly disciplined way of studying and general academic skills.
Comments are a blend of logic and narrative, including many hadith (though the only source stated for these narratives is Sahih Muslim) and older accounts of Arabic poems. A very elegant analysis of words is done throughout the commentary, while figurative expressions are broken down, and appropriate qira'at is chosen where needed. Abrogated verses are indicated along with their successors. Verses containing Islamic jurisprudence are deduced according to the Hanafi school of law. Verses that seem contrary are reconciled.

Criticism

Muʿtazilah viewpoint 

One of the most criticized aspects of Al-Zamakhshari’s interpretations is his adaptation of Quranic verses according to a Mu’tazilite viewpoint. For those who vehemently oppose the Mu'tazilites and their views, Al-Zamakhshari has purportedly interpreted verses that cohere with his viewpoint as muhkam (rigid or univocal), and those which do not as mutashabih (ambiguous, equivocal, or allegorical). Thus, opponents of the Mu'tazilites accused him of "abandoning the apparent meanings" of some verses for the sake of preserving a strict Mu’tazilah view. Consequently, some have made "responses" to Al-Zamakhshari's, such as ِِ'Al-'intişaaf min Al-Kashshaaf "Vengeance against Al-Kashshaaf" by Ibn Munir Al-Sakandari (1223-1284).

Editions 

There are at least three different editions of the book. Ibn Hisham Nahvi speculated some errors with some meanings given to certain words, correcting them in his own edition of the book.

Related Works 
 Tafsir al-Baydawi is largely a condensed and amended edition of Al-Kashshaaf
 Tafsir al-Nisaburi

External links 
 You can't tell a book by its author: A study of Muʿtazilite theology in al-Zamakhsharī's (d. 538/1144) Kashshāf

References 

Tafsir works
12th-century Arabic books